The 1929–30  Hong Kong First Division League season was the 22nd since its establishment.

League table

References
RSSSF
香港倒後鏡blog

Hong Kong First Division League seasons
1929–30 domestic association football leagues
3